In functional analysis, compactly supported wavelets derived from Legendre polynomials are termed Legendre wavelets or spherical harmonic wavelets. Legendre functions have widespread applications in which spherical coordinate system is appropriate. As with many wavelets there is no nice analytical formula for describing these harmonic spherical wavelets. The low-pass filter associated to Legendre multiresolution analysis is a finite impulse response (FIR) filter.

Wavelets associated to FIR filters are commonly preferred in most applications. An extra appealing feature is that the Legendre filters are linear phase FIR (i.e. multiresolution analysis associated with linear phase filters). These wavelets have been implemented on MATLAB (wavelet toolbox). Although being compactly supported wavelet, legdN are not orthogonal (but for N = 1).

Legendre multiresolution filters 
Associated Legendre polynomials are the colatitudinal part of the spherical harmonics which are common to all separations of Laplace's equation in spherical polar coordinates.  The radial part of the solution varies from one potential to another, but the harmonics are always the same and are a consequence of spherical symmetry. Spherical harmonics  are solutions of the Legendre -order differential equation, n integer:

 

 polynomials can be used to define the smoothing filter  of a multiresolution analysis (MRA).

 

Illustrative examples of filter transfer functions for a Legendre MRA are shown in figure 1, for  A low-pass behaviour is exhibited for the filter H, as expected. The number of zeroes within  is equal to the degree of the Legendre polynomial. Therefore, the roll-off of side-lobes with frequency is easily controlled by the parameter .

The low-pass filter transfer function is given by

 

The transfer function of the high-pass analysing filter  is chosen according to Quadrature mirror filter condition, yielding:

 

Legendre multiresolution filter coefficients 

A suitable phase assignment is done so as to properly adjust the transfer function  to the form

The filter coefficients  are given by:

from which the symmetry:

follows.

 N.B. The minus signal can be suppressed.

MATLAB implementation of Legendre wavelets 

Legendre wavelets can be easily loaded into the MATLAB wavelet toolbox—The m-files to allow the computation of Legendre wavelet transform, details and filter are (freeware) available. The finite support width Legendre family is denoted by legd (short name). Wavelets: 'legdN'.

Legendre wavelets can be derived from the low-pass reconstruction filter by an iterative procedure (the cascade algorithm). The wavelet has compact support and finite impulse response AMR filters (FIR) are used (table 1). The first wavelet of the Legendre's family is exactly the well-known Haar wavelet. Figure 2 shows an emerging pattern that progressively looks like the wavelet's shape.

The Legendre wavelet shape can be visualised using the wavemenu command of MATLAB. Figure 3 shows legd8 wavelet displayed using MATLAB. Legendre Polynomials are also associated with windows families.

Legendre wavelet packets 

Wavelet packets (WP) systems derived from Legendre wavelets can also be easily accomplished. Figure 5 illustrates the WP functions derived from legd2.

References

Bibliography
 M.M.S. Lira, H.M. de Oliveira, M.A. Carvalho Jr, R.M.C.Souza,  Compactly Supported Wavelets Derived from Legendre Polynomials: Spherical Harmonic Wavelets,  In: Computational Methods in Circuits and Systems Applications, N.E. Mastorakis, I.A. Stahopulos, C. Manikopoulos, G.E. Antoniou, V.M. Mladenov, I.F. Gonos Eds., WSEAS press, pp. 211–215, 2003. . Available at ee.ufpe.br
 A. A. Colomer and A. A. Colomer, Adaptive ECG Data Compression Using Discrete Legendre Transform, Digital Signal Processing, 7, 1997, pp. 222–228.
 A.G. Ramm, A.I. Zaslavsky, X-Ray Transform, the Legendre Transform, and Envelopes, J. of Math. Analysis and Appl., 183, pp. 528–546, 1994.
 C. Herley, M. Vetterli, Orthogonalization of Compactly Supported Wavelet Bases, IEEE Digital Signal Process. Workshop, 13-16 Sep., pp. 1.7.1-1.7.2, 1992.
 S. Mallat, A Theory for Multiresolution Signal Decomposition: The Wavelet Representation, IEEE Transactions on Pattern Analysis and Machine Intelligence, 11, July pp. 674–693, 1989.
 M. Vetterli, C. Herly, Wavelets and Filter Banks: Theory and Design, IEEE Trans. on Acoustics, Speech, and Signal Processing, 40, 9, p. 2207, 1992.
 M. Jaskula, New Windows Family Based on Modified Legendre Polynomials, IEEE Instrum. And Measurement Technol. Conf., Anchorage, AK, May, 2002, pp. 553–556.

Wavelets